Hakahau is the main village and port of the island of Ua Pou,  in the Marquesas Islands, northeast of French Polynesia. It is the capital of the municipality. It is located at the bottom of a sheltered bay on the northeast side of the island, and has a sheltered dock by a jetty.  The Aranui 3 stops at Hakahau.

Geography

Climate

Hakahau has a tropical monsoon climate (Köppen climate classification Am).

References

Populated places in the Marquesas Islands